Combustion, or burning, is a high-temperature exothermic redox chemical reaction between a fuel (the reductant) and an oxidant, usually atmospheric oxygen, that produces oxidized, often gaseous products, in a mixture termed as smoke. Combustion does not always result in fire, because a flame is only visible when substances undergoing combustion vaporize, but when it does, a flame is a characteristic indicator of the reaction. While the activation energy must be overcome to initiate combustion (e.g., using a lit match to light a fire), the heat from a flame may provide enough energy to make the reaction self-sustaining.

Combustion is often a complicated sequence of elementary radical reactions. Solid fuels, such as wood and coal, first undergo endothermic pyrolysis to produce gaseous fuels whose combustion then supplies the heat required to produce more of them. Combustion is often hot enough that incandescent light in the form of either glowing or a flame is produced. A simple example can be seen in the combustion of hydrogen and oxygen into water vapor, a reaction which is commonly used to fuel rocket engines. This reaction releases 242kJ/mol of heat and reduces the enthalpy accordingly (at constant temperature and pressure):

 2H_2(g){+}O_2(g)\rightarrow 2H_2O\uparrow

Uncatalyzed combustion in air requires relatively high temperatures. Complete combustion is stoichiometric concerning the fuel, where there is no remaining fuel, and ideally, no residual oxidant. Thermodynamically, the chemical equilibrium of combustion in air is overwhelmingly on the side of the products. However, complete combustion is almost impossible to achieve, since the chemical equilibrium is not necessarily reached, or may contain unburnt products such as carbon monoxide, hydrogen and even carbon (soot or ash). Thus, the produced smoke is usually toxic and contains unburned or partially oxidized products. Any combustion at high temperatures in atmospheric air, which is 78 percent nitrogen, will also create small amounts of several nitrogen oxides, commonly referred to as NOx, since the combustion of nitrogen is thermodynamically favored at high, but not low temperatures. Since burning is rarely clean, fuel gas cleaning or catalytic converters may be required by law.

Fires occur naturally, ignited by lightning strikes or by volcanic products. Combustion (fire) was the first controlled chemical reaction discovered by humans, in the form of campfires and bonfires, and continues to be the main method to produce energy for humanity. Usually, the fuel is carbon, hydrocarbons, or more complicated mixtures such as wood that contain partially oxidized hydrocarbons. The thermal energy produced from the combustion of either fossil fuels such as coal or oil, or from renewable fuels such as firewood, is harvested for diverse uses such as cooking, production of electricity or industrial or domestic heating. Combustion is also currently the only reaction used to power rockets. Combustion is also used to destroy (incinerate) waste, both nonhazardous and hazardous.

Oxidants for combustion have high oxidation potential and include atmospheric or pure oxygen, chlorine, fluorine, chlorine trifluoride, nitrous oxide and nitric acid. For instance, hydrogen burns in chlorine to form hydrogen chloride with the liberation of heat and light characteristic of combustion. Although usually not catalyzed, combustion can be catalyzed by platinum or vanadium, as in the contact process.

Types

Complete and incomplete

Complete

In complete combustion, the reactant burns in oxygen and produces a limited number of products. When a hydrocarbon burns in oxygen, the reaction will primarily yield carbon dioxide and water. When elements are burned, the products are primarily the most common oxides. Carbon will yield carbon dioxide, sulfur will yield sulfur dioxide, and iron will yield iron(III) oxide. Nitrogen is not considered to be a combustible substance when oxygen is the oxidant. Still, small amounts of various nitrogen oxides (commonly designated  species) form when the air is the oxidative.

Combustion is not necessarily favorable to the maximum degree of oxidation, and it can be temperature-dependent.

In most industrial applications and in fires, air is the source of oxygen. On the other hand, when there is insufficient oxygen to combust the fuel completely, some fuel carbon is converted to carbon monoxide, and some of the hydrogens remain unreacted. A complete set of equations for the combustion of a hydrocarbon in the air, therefore, requires an additional calculation for the distribution of oxygen between the carbon and hydrogen in the fuel.

The amount of air required for complete combustion to take place is known as pure air. However, in practice, the air used is 2-3 times that of pure air.

Incomplete

Incomplete combustion will occur when there is not enough oxygen to allow the fuel to react completely to produce carbon dioxide and water. It also happens when the combustion is quenched by a heat sink, such as a solid surface or flame trap. As is the case with complete combustion, water is produced by incomplete combustion; however, carbon and carbon monoxide are produced instead of carbon dioxide.

For most fuels, such as diesel oil, coal, or wood, pyrolysis occurs before combustion. In incomplete combustion, products of pyrolysis remain unburnt and contaminate the smoke with noxious particulate matter and gases. Partially oxidized compounds are also a concern; partial oxidation of ethanol can produce harmful acetaldehyde, and carbon can produce toxic carbon monoxide.

The designs of combustion devices can improve the quality of combustion, such as burners and internal combustion engines. Further improvements are achievable by catalytic after-burning devices (such as catalytic converters) or by the simple partial return of the exhaust gases into the combustion process. Such devices are required by environmental legislation for cars in most countries. They may be necessary to enable large combustion devices, such as thermal power stations, to reach legal emission standards.

The degree of combustion can be measured and analyzed with test equipment. HVAC contractors, firefighters and engineers use combustion analyzers to test the efficiency of a burner during the combustion process. Also, the efficiency of an internal combustion engine can be measured in this way, and some U.S. states and local municipalities use combustion analysis to define and rate the efficiency of vehicles on the road today.

Carbon monoxide is one of the products from incomplete combustion. The formation of carbon monoxide produces less heat than formation of carbon dioxide so complete combustion is greatly preferred especially as carbon monoxide is a poisonous gas. When breathed, carbon monoxide takes the place of oxygen and combines with some of the hemoglobin in the blood, rendering it unable to transport oxygen.

Problems associated with incomplete combustion

Environmental problems 
These oxides combine with water and oxygen in the atmosphere, creating nitric acid and sulfuric acids, which return to Earth's surface as acid deposition, or "acid rain." Acid deposition harms aquatic organisms and kills trees. Due to its formation of certain nutrients that are less available to plants such as calcium and phosphorus, it reduces the productivity of the ecosystem and farms. An additional problem associated with nitrogen oxides is that they, along with hydrocarbon pollutants, contribute to the formation of ground level ozone, a major component of smog.

Human health problems 
Breathing carbon monoxide causes headache, dizziness, vomiting, and nausea. If carbon monoxide levels are high enough, humans become unconscious or die. Exposure to moderate and high levels of carbon monoxide over long periods is positively correlated with the risk of heart disease. People who survive severe carbon monoxide poisoning may suffer long-term health problems. Carbon monoxide from the air is absorbed in the lungs which then binds with hemoglobin in human's red blood cells. This would reduce the capacity of red blood cells to carry oxygen throughout the body.

Smoldering
Smoldering is the slow, low-temperature, flameless form of combustion, sustained by the heat evolved when oxygen directly attacks the surface of a condensed-phase fuel. It is a typically incomplete combustion reaction. Solid materials that can sustain a smoldering reaction include coal, cellulose, wood, cotton, tobacco, peat, duff, humus, synthetic foams, charring polymers (including polyurethane foam) and dust. Common examples of smoldering phenomena are the initiation of residential fires on upholstered furniture by weak heat sources (e.g., a cigarette, a short-circuited wire) and the persistent combustion of biomass behind the flaming fronts of wildfires.

Rapid

Rapid combustion is a form of combustion, otherwise known as a fire, in which large amounts of heat and light energy are released, which often results in a flame. This is used in a form of machinery such as internal combustion engines and in thermobaric weapons. Such a combustion is frequently called a Rapid combustion, though for an internal combustion engine, this is inaccurate. An internal combustion engine nominally operates on a controlled rapid burn. When the fuel-air mixture in an internal combustion engine explodes, that is known as detonation.

Spontaneous
Spontaneous combustion is a type of combustion that occurs by self-heating (increase in temperature due to exothermic internal reactions), followed by thermal runaway (self-heating which rapidly accelerates to high temperatures) and finally, ignition.
For example, phosphorus self-ignites at room temperature without the application of heat. Organic materials undergoing bacterial composting can generate enough heat to reach the point of combustion.

Turbulent
Combustion resulting in a turbulent flame is the most used for industrial applications (e.g. gas turbines, gasoline engines, etc.) because the turbulence helps the mixing process between the fuel and oxidizer.

Micro-gravity

The term 'micro' gravity refers to a gravitational state that is 'low' (i.e., 'micro' in the sense of 'small' and not necessarily a millionth of Earth's normal gravity) such that the influence of buoyancy on physical processes may be considered small relative to other flow processes that would be present at normal gravity. In such an environment, the thermal and flow transport dynamics can behave quite differently than in normal gravity conditions (e.g., a candle's flame takes the shape of a sphere.). Microgravity combustion research contributes to the understanding of a wide variety of aspects that are relevant to both the environment of a spacecraft (e.g., fire dynamics relevant to crew safety on the International Space Station) and terrestrial (Earth-based) conditions (e.g., droplet combustion dynamics to assist developing new fuel blends for improved combustion, materials fabrication processes, thermal management of electronic systems, multiphase flow boiling dynamics, and many others).

Micro-combustion
Combustion processes that happen in very small volumes are considered micro-combustion. The high surface-to-volume ratio increases specific heat loss. Quenching distance plays a vital role in stabilizing the flame in such combustion chambers.

Chemical equations

Stoichiometric combustion of a hydrocarbon in oxygen

Generally, the chemical equation for stoichiometric combustion of a hydrocarbon in oxygen is:
 C_\mathit{x}H_\mathit{y}{} + \mathit{z}O2 -> \mathit{x}CO2{} + \frac{\mathit{y}}{2}H2O
where .

For example, the stoichiometric burning of propane in oxygen is:
 \underset{propane\atop (fuel)}{C3H8} + \underset{oxygen}{5O2} -> \underset{carbon\ dioxide}{3CO2} + \underset{water}{4H2O}

Stoichiometric combustion of a hydrocarbon in air

If the stoichiometric combustion takes place using air as the oxygen source, the nitrogen present in the air (Atmosphere of Earth) can be added to the equation (although it does not react) to show the stoichiometric composition of the fuel in air and the composition of the resultant flue gas. Note that treating all non-oxygen components in air as nitrogen gives a 'nitrogen' to oxygen ratio of 3.77, i.e. (100% - O2%) / O2% where O2% is 20.95% vol:
 
where .

For example, the stoichiometric combustion of propane (C3H8) in air is:
 

The stoichiometric composition of propane in air is 1 / (1 + 5 + 18.87) = 4.02% vol.

The stoichiometric combustion reaction for CHO in air:

 

The stoichiometric combustion reaction for CHOS:

 

The stoichiometric combustion reaction for CHONS:

 

The stoichiometric combustion reaction for CHOF:

Trace combustion products

At , the equilibrium combustion products contain 0.03%  and 0.002% . At , the combustion products contain 0.17% , 0.05% , 0.01% , and 0.004% .

Diesel engines are run with an excess of oxygen to combust small particles that tend to form with only a stoichiometric amount of oxygen, necessarily producing nitrogen oxide emissions. Both the United States and European Union enforce limits to vehicle nitrogen oxide emissions, which necessitate the use of special catalytic converters or treatment of the exhaust with urea (see Diesel exhaust fluid).

Incomplete combustion of a hydrocarbon in oxygen

Such gas mixtures are commonly prepared for use as protective atmospheres for the heat-treatment of metals and for gas carburizing. The general reaction equation for incomplete combustion of one mole of a hydrocarbon in oxygen is:

 \underset{fuel}{C_\mathit{x} H_\mathit{y}} + \underset{oxygen}{\mathit{z} O2} -> \underset{carbon \ dioxide}{\mathit{a}CO2} + \underset{carbon\ monoxide}{\mathit{b}CO} + \underset{water}{\mathit{c}H2O} + \underset{hydrogen}{\mathit{d}H2}

When z falls below roughly 50% of the stoichiometric value,  can become an important combustion product; when z falls below roughly 35% of the stoichiometric value, elemental carbon may become stable.

The products of incomplete combustion can be calculated with the aid of a material balance, together with the assumption that the combustion products reach equilibrium. The three elemental balance equations are:
 Carbon: 
 Hydrogen: 
 Oxygen: 

These three equations are insufficient in themselves to calculate the combustion gas composition.
However, at the equilibrium position, the water-gas shift reaction gives another equation:

 CO + H2O -> CO2 + H2; 

For example, at  the value of K is 0.728. Solving, the combustion gas consists of 42.4% , 29.0% , 14.7% , and 13.9% .

Substances or materials which undergo combustion are called fuels. The most common examples are natural gas, propane, kerosene, diesel, petrol, charcoal, coal, wood, etc.

Liquid fuels

Combustion of a liquid fuel in an oxidizing atmosphere actually happens in the gas phase. It is the vapor that burns, not the liquid. Therefore, a liquid will normally catch fire only above a certain temperature: its flash point. The flash point of liquid fuel is the lowest temperature at which it can form an ignitable mix with air. It is the minimum temperature at which there is enough evaporated fuel in the air to start combustion.

Gaseous fuels 
Combustion of gaseous fuels may occur through one of four distinctive types of burning: diffusion flame, premixed flame, autoignitive reaction front, or as a detonation. The type of burning that actually occurs depends on the degree to which the fuel and oxidizer are mixed prior to heating: for example, a diffusion flame is formed if the fuel and oxidizer are separated initially, whereas a premixed flame is formed otherwise. Similarly, the type of burning also depends on the pressure: a detonation, for example, is an autoignitive reaction front coupled to a strong shock wave giving it its characteristic high-pressure peak and high detonation velocity.

Solid fuels

The act of combustion consists of three relatively distinct but overlapping phases:
 Preheating phase, when the unburned fuel is heated up to its flash point and then fire point. Flammable gases start being evolved in a process similar to dry distillation.
 Distillation phase or gaseous phase, when the mix of evolved flammable gases with oxygen is ignited. Energy is produced in the form of heat and light. Flames are often visible. Heat transfer from the combustion to the solid maintains the evolution of flammable vapours.
 Charcoal phase or solid phase, when the output of flammable gases from the material is too low for the persistent presence of flame and the charred fuel does not burn rapidly and just glows and later only smoulders.

Combustion management
Efficient process heating requires recovery of the largest possible part of a fuel's heat of combustion into the material being processed. There are many avenues of loss in the operation of a heating process. Typically, the dominant loss is sensible heat leaving with the offgas (i.e., the flue gas). The temperature and quantity of offgas indicates its heat content (enthalpy), so keeping its quantity low minimizes heat loss.

In a perfect furnace, the combustion air flow would be matched to the fuel flow to give each fuel molecule the exact amount of oxygen needed to cause complete combustion. However, in the real world, combustion does not proceed in a perfect manner. Unburned fuel (usually  and ) discharged from the system represents a heating value loss (as well as a safety hazard). Since combustibles are undesirable in the offgas, while the presence of unreacted oxygen there presents minimal safety and environmental concerns, the first principle of combustion management is to provide more oxygen than is theoretically needed to ensure that all the fuel burns. For methane combustion, for example, slightly more than two molecules of oxygen are required.

The second principle of combustion management, however, is to not use too much oxygen. The correct amount of oxygen requires three types of measurement: first, active control of air and fuel flow; second, offgas oxygen measurement; and third, measurement of offgas combustibles. For each heating process, there exists an optimum condition of minimal offgas heat loss with acceptable levels of combustibles concentration. Minimizing excess oxygen pays an additional benefit: for a given offgas temperature, the NOx level is lowest when excess oxygen is kept lowest.

Adherence to these two principles is furthered by making material and heat balances on the combustion process. The heat balance relates the heat available for the charge to the overall net heat produced by fuel combustion. Additional material and heat balances can be made to quantify the thermal advantage from preheating the combustion air, or enriching it in oxygen.

Reaction mechanism

Combustion in oxygen is a chain reaction in which many distinct radical intermediates participate. The high energy required for initiation is explained by the unusual structure of the dioxygen molecule. The lowest-energy configuration of the dioxygen molecule is a stable, relatively unreactive diradical in a triplet spin state. Bonding can be described with three bonding electron pairs and two antibonding electrons, with spins aligned, such that the molecule has nonzero total angular momentum. Most fuels, on the other hand, are in a singlet state, with paired spins and zero total angular momentum. Interaction between the two is quantum mechanically a "forbidden transition", i.e. possible with a very low probability. To initiate combustion, energy is required to force dioxygen into a spin-paired state, or singlet oxygen. This intermediate is extremely reactive. The energy is supplied as heat, and the reaction then produces additional heat, which allows it to continue.

Combustion of hydrocarbons is thought to be initiated by hydrogen atom abstraction (not proton abstraction) from the fuel to oxygen, to give a hydroperoxide radical (HOO). This reacts further to give hydroperoxides, which break up to give hydroxyl radicals. There are a great variety of these processes that produce fuel radicals and oxidizing radicals. Oxidizing species include singlet oxygen, hydroxyl, monatomic oxygen, and hydroperoxyl. Such intermediates are short-lived and cannot be isolated. However, non-radical intermediates are stable and are produced in incomplete combustion. An example is acetaldehyde produced in the combustion of ethanol. An intermediate in the combustion of carbon and hydrocarbons, carbon monoxide, is of special importance because it is a poisonous gas, but also economically useful for the production of syngas.

Solid and heavy liquid fuels also undergo a great number of pyrolysis reactions that give more easily oxidized, gaseous fuels. These reactions are endothermic and require constant energy input from the ongoing combustion reactions. A lack of oxygen or other improperly designed conditions result in these noxious and carcinogenic pyrolysis products being emitted as thick, black smoke.

The rate of combustion is the amount of a material that undergoes combustion over a period of time. It can be expressed in grams per second (g/s) or kilograms per second (kg/s).

Detailed descriptions of combustion processes, from the chemical kinetics perspective, require the formulation of large and intricate webs of elementary reactions. For instance, combustion of hydrocarbon fuels typically involve hundreds of chemical species reacting according to thousands of reactions.

The inclusion of such mechanisms within computational flow solvers still represents a pretty challenging task mainly in two aspects. First, the number of degrees of freedom (proportional to the number of chemical species) can be dramatically large; second, the source term due to reactions introduces a disparate number of time scales which makes the whole dynamical system stiff. As a result, the direct numerical simulation of turbulent reactive flows with heavy fuels soon becomes intractable even for modern supercomputers.

Therefore, a plethora of methodologies have been devised for reducing the complexity of combustion mechanisms without resorting to high detail levels. Examples are provided by:
 The Relaxation Redistribution Method (RRM)
 The Intrinsic Low-Dimensional Manifold (ILDM) approach and further developments
 The invariant-constrained equilibrium edge preimage curve method.
 A few variational approaches
 The Computational Singular perturbation (CSP) method and further developments.
 The Rate Controlled Constrained Equilibrium (RCCE) and Quasi Equilibrium Manifold (QEM) approach.
 The G-Scheme.
 The Method of Invariant Grids (MIG).

Kinetic modelling

The kinetic modelling may be explored for insight into the reaction mechanisms of thermal decomposition in the combustion of different materials by using for instance Thermogravimetric analysis.

Temperature

Assuming perfect combustion conditions, such as complete combustion under adiabatic conditions (i.e., no heat loss or gain), the adiabatic combustion temperature can be determined. The formula that yields this temperature is based on the first law of thermodynamics and takes note of the fact that the heat of combustion is used entirely for heating the fuel, the combustion air or oxygen, and the combustion product gases (commonly referred to as the flue gas).

In the case of fossil fuels burnt in air, the combustion temperature depends on all of the following:
 the heating value;
 the stoichiometric air to fuel ratio ;
 the specific heat capacity of fuel and air;
 the air and fuel inlet temperatures.

The adiabatic combustion temperature (also known as the adiabatic flame temperature) increases for higher heating values and inlet air and fuel temperatures and for stoichiometric air ratios approaching one.

In industrial fired heaters, power station steam generators, and large gas-fired turbines, the more common way of expressing the usage of more than the stoichiometric combustion air is percent excess combustion air. For example, excess combustion air of 15 percent means that 15 percent more than the required stoichiometric air is being used.

Instabilities
Combustion instabilities are typically violent pressure oscillations in a combustion chamber. These pressure oscillations can be as high as 180dB, and long-term exposure to these cyclic pressure and thermal loads reduces the life of engine components. In rockets, such as the F1 used in the Saturn V program, instabilities led to massive damage to the combustion chamber and surrounding components. This problem was solved by re-designing the fuel injector. In liquid jet engines, the droplet size and distribution can be used to attenuate the instabilities. Combustion instabilities are a major concern in ground-based gas turbine engines because of  emissions. The tendency is to run lean, an equivalence ratio less than 1, to reduce the combustion temperature and thus reduce the  emissions; however, running the combustion lean makes it very susceptible to combustion instability.

The Rayleigh Criterion is the basis for analysis of thermoacoustic combustion instability and is evaluated using the Rayleigh Index over one cycle of instability

where q' is the heat release rate perturbation and p' is the pressure fluctuation.
When the heat release oscillations are in phase with the pressure oscillations, the Rayleigh Index is positive and the magnitude of the thermoacoustic instability is maximised. On the other hand, if the Rayleigh Index is negative, then thermoacoustic damping occurs. The Rayleigh Criterion implies that thermoacoustic instability can be optimally controlled by having heat release oscillations 180 degrees out of phase with pressure oscillations at the same frequency. This minimizes the Rayleigh Index.

See also

Related concepts
 Air–fuel ratio
 Autoignition temperature
 Chemical looping combustion
 Deflagration
 Detonation
 Explosion
 Fire
 Flame
 Heterogeneous combustion
 Markstein number
 Phlogiston theory (historical)
 Spontaneous combustion

Machines and equipment
 Boiler
 Bunsen burner
 External combustion engine
 Furnace
 Gas turbine
 Internal combustion engine
 Rocket engine

Scientific and engineering societies
 International Flame Research Foundation
 The Combustion Institute

Other
 List of light sources

References

Further reading

 
 
 
 
 
 
 
 

 
Chemical reactions